Bereft may refer to:
 Bereft (film), 2004 American television film
 Bereft (TV series)
 Bereft (novel)